Collectif Paris Africa (Paris-Africa Collective) is a French group and French speaking international artists united by UNICEF. Its purpose is to collect money for nutrition and food for the poor countries in Horn of Africa (Eritrea, Djibouti, Ethiopia and Somalia). The group released a single called "Des ricochets" ("skimming stones"), referring to the poor availability of fresh water in the area) which was followed by compilation album Collectif Paris-Africa pour l'Unicef.

List of artists 

Alizée
Alpha Blondy
Alain Chamfort
Amaury Vassili
Amine
Amel Bent
Anggun
Arielle Dombasle
Benabar
Bob Sinclar
Chico & Les Gypsies
Chimène Badi
Christophe Willem
Claudia Tagbo
Colonel Reyel
Dave
David Hallyday
Didier Wampas
Elisa Tovati
Fatals Picards
Florent Mothe
Gary Fico
Gérard Lenorman
Grégoire
Hélène Ségara
Inna Modja
Jane Birkin
Jenifer
BB Brunes
Jérôme Commandeur
Jérôme Van Den Hole
John Mamann
Joyce Jonathan
Judith
Julie Zenatti
Kenza Farah
Lââm
Liane Foly
M Pokora
Magic System
Manu Katché
Maurane
Mélissa Nkonda
Merwan Rim
Mickael Miro
Mikelangelo Loconte
Mimie Mathy
Moïse N’Tumba
Mokobe
Natasha St-Pier
Nicolas Peyrac
Nolwenn Leroy
Nyco Lilliu
Olivier de Benoist
Ophélie Winter
Passi
Patrick Fiori
Peps
Philippe Lavil
Quentin Mosimann
Salvatore Adamo
Shy'm
Sofia Essaidi
Soprano
Tal
Tiken Jah Fakoly
Tina Arena
VV Brown
Ycare

Discography

Albums

Singles

References

Musical groups established in 2011
French musical groups
2011 establishments in France
Charities based in France
Foreign charities operating in Djibouti